The Isle of Wight Railway Company can refer to two bodies:
 The historical company which built and operated the Isle of Wight Railway network from 1864 to 1923.
 The modern company which formed from the Wight Locomotive Society, which re-built, operates and maintains the Isle of Wight Steam Railway.